Gustav Lange (13 August 1830 – 20 July 1889) was a German composer known mainly for his melodious salon music for the piano.

Life
Lange was born in Schwerstedt, near Erfurt, Prussian Saxony, in 1830. He received initial musical training from his father on the piano and organ, followed by conservatory studies in piano, organ, thorough bass, and composition – probably at the Royal Institute for Church Music in Berlin. His teachers included August Wilhelm Bach, Eduard Grell, and Albert Löschhorn.

He lived for many years in Berlin and died at Wernigerode in 1889.

Music
Encouraged by the success of some 1860s compositions, Lange produced a large number of works, most of which were light and popular piano pieces of which he wrote around 500. Edelweiss op. 31 and Blumenlied op. 39 (alternatively known as Flower Song in English) are perhaps two of his best-known works today.

A contemporary English source says: "Many of these pieces are very pleasing and pretty in character, but they are not marked by any very striking features".

Selected compositions (piano)

Lamentation d'une jeunne fille op. 10
Farewell! op. 15
Prière à la Madonne op. 17
Fête militaire op. 18
Le Retour de soldat op. 19
Sehnsuchtsklänge op. 20
Die Libelle op. 24
Jägerfahrt op. 26
Dolorosa op. 28
Edelweiß op. 31
Blumenlied op. 39
Fischerlied op. 43
Langage d'amour op. 45
Au bivouac op. 47
Fleurs fanées op. 48
Minnelied op. 51
Einsame Tränen op. 52
Hortensia op. 53
Dein Eigen op. 54
Liebesahnung op. 75
Heidenröslein op. 78 
Aus Herzensgrunde op. 85
Blumenmärchen op. 93
Immortellen op. 94
Mein Sohn, wo willst du hin so spät? Op.165 
(Arrangement of Felix Mendelssohn's Winterlied (No.3) from 6 Gesänge, Op.19a for single piano)
Drei Fantasie-Transkriptionen über Opernarien von G. Meyerbeer op. 207
Offenbach-Fantasien op. 208
Valse mélancholique op. 210
Zwei Waldidyllen op. 211
Vier Lieder von Anton Rubinstein frei übertragen op. 212
Fantasie-Transkriptionen über drei Lieder von Franz Abt op. 213
Paraphrase über die Schlummerarie aus der Oper 'Die Stumme von Portici' von D.F.E. Auber op. 214
Paraphrase über die Romanze der Ines aus der Oper 'Die Afrikanerin' von G. Meyerbeer op. 215
Fantasie-Polonaise nach Motiven von B. Bilses beliebter Königs-Polonaise op. 216
Drei Fantasie-Transkriptionen über Lieder und Arien von W.A. Mozart op. 217

Die Maccabäer op. 237
Das goldene Kreuz op. 254
Der Landfriede op. 255
Sérénade irlandaise op. 409
Melitta op. 417
Almröschen op. 418
Im Ahnenschloss op. 419
Blumenklage op. 420
Begegnung auf der Alm op. 421
Les Pages de la Reine op. 422
Aus der Kindheit frohen Tagen op. 427
Frohes Wandern op. 428
Die Lotosblume op. 429
Marguerite op. 430
Lieb' Mütterlein op. 431
Marcella op. 432
L'Adieu op. 433
Gitanella op. 434
La Danse au Tyrol op. 435
Après le travail op. 436
Plaisirs de l'automne op. 437
Im Zwielicht op. 445
Von Zweig zu Zweig op. 447
Graziosa op. 448
Sérénade du gondolier op. 451
La jeunne fille de Pologne op. 453
Liebesreigen op. 455
Gavotte favorite op. 457
Heckenrosen op. 462
Les Grenadiers du Roi op. 464
Marche des Mineurs op. 474
Calme-toi! op. 475
La Petite flatteuse op. 480
Jour de répos op. 485
Fleur printanière op. 487
Danse des fleurs op. 489
Folâtrerie op. 491
Les Mois de roses op. 493

References

External links
 
 

1830 births
1889 deaths
19th-century classical composers
19th-century German composers
Composers for piano
German male classical composers
German Romantic composers
19th-century German male musicians